Hinugot sa Langit (lit. "Plucked from Heaven") is a 1985 Gawad Urian Award winning Filipino melodramatic film directed by Ishmael Bernal based on moral values. It is considered a classic in Filipino cinema and picked up four Gawad Urian Awards. It is about an unwanted pregnancy and issues with abortion and the church.

Cast

Maricel Soriano as Carmen Castro
Al Tantay as Jerry
Rowell Santiago as Bobby
Charito Solis as Juling
Amy Austria as Estella
Dante Rivero as Dr. Sison
Susan Africa
Jaime Asencio
Vic Jose
Crispin Medina
Tony Pascua
Mario Taguiwalo
Leticia Tison
Ray Ventura
Aurora Yumul

Soundtrack and cinematography
The film won Gawad Urian Awards for Best Direction, Best Editing, Best Production Design and Best Sound in 1986.

Reception

Box office

Critical response

References

External links

1985 films
1985 drama films
Filipino-language films
Films about abortion
Films about Christianity
Films directed by Ishmael Bernal
Tagalog-language films
Philippine drama films